Iselin is a Norwegian feminine given name (2937 as first name, 2404 second).

Origin 
It has several possible origins:
 German pet form of Old High German names beginning with Ise[n]- (e.g. Iselinde or Isengard).
 German pet form of Isa
 Norwegian variant form of the Irish name Aisling

Notable people 
Notable Norwegians with the given name include;
 Iselin Alme (born 1957), Norwegian singer and stage actress
 Iselin Michelsen (born 1990), Norwegian model and singer
 Iselin Nybø (born 1981), Norwegian politician
 Iselin Solheim (born 1990), Norwegian singer-songwriter
 Iselin Steiro (born 1985), Norwegian model

References 

Norwegian feminine given names